Vice Admiral Sir William Munro Kerr  (4 March 1876 – 26 October 1959) was a Royal Navy officer who served as First Naval Member and Chief of the Australian Naval Staff from 1929 to 1931.

Naval service
Born the son of George Munro Kerr and his wife, Jessie Elizabeth Martin, Kerr joined the Royal Navy as a midshipman in 1892. In November 1901, Kerr—by then a lieutenant—was lent to the Royal Naval College, Greenwich for the compass course. In May the following year he was appointed lieutenant in charge of navigation at HMS Hermione, serving at the Mediterranean station. After serving in the First World War, he was appointed Captain of the Dockyard and King's Harbour Master at Rosyth in 1921 and Rear Admiral of the 1st Battle Squadron of the Mediterranean Fleet in 1928. He went on to be First Naval Member and Chief of the Australian Naval Staff in 1929 and, having been promoted to vice admiral in 1931, he became Commander-in-Chief of the Reserve Fleet later that year. He retired in 1936.

He died at Lymington in Hampshire in October 1959.

References

|-

1876 births
1959 deaths
Companions of the Order of the Bath
Knights Commander of the Order of the British Empire
Royal Navy vice admirals
Royal Navy personnel of World War I
People from East Dunbartonshire